is a railway station in Miyako, Fukuoka Prefecture, Japan. It is on the Tagawa Line, operated by the Heisei Chikuhō Railway. Trains arrive roughly every 30 minutes.

On 1 April 2009, an advertising agency headquartered in Tokyo, acquired naming rights to the station.

Platforms

External links
Sakiyama Station (Heisei Chikuhō Railway website)

References

Railway stations in Fukuoka Prefecture
Railway stations in Japan opened in 1956
Heisei Chikuhō Railway Tagawa Line